Live at Sandy's is a live album by saxophonist/vocalist Eddie "Cleanhed" Vinson which was recorded at Sandy's Jazz Revival in 1978 and released on the Muse label in 1981.

Reception

The AllMusic review by Scott Yanow stated "Muse recorded six albums during one week at Sandy's Jazz Revival, a club in Beverly, MA; two of them (this one and Hold It Right There) feature the blues vocals and alto solos of Eddie "Cleanhead" Vinson. Some of the songs also have the tenors of Arnett Cobb and Buddy Tate in a supporting role but this album is largely Vinson's show. Backed by a superb rhythm section, Vinson takes four fine vocals and plays many swinging alto solos".

Track listing
All compositions by Eddie Vinson except where noted
 "Cleanhead Blues" – 5:29
 "Tune Up" (Miles Davis) – 4:49
 "High Class Baby" – 8:38
 "Railroad Porter Blues" (Jessie Mae Robinson) – 4:05
 "My Man Sandy" – 8:48
 "Things Ain't What They Used to Be" (Mercer Ellington, Ted Persons) – 8:10

Personnel
Eddie "Cleanhead" Vinson – alto saxophone, vocals
Arnett Cobb, Buddy Tate - tenor saxophone
Ray Bryant – piano
George Duvivier – bass
Alan Dawson – drums

References

Muse Records live albums
Eddie Vinson live albums
1981 live albums
Albums produced by Bob Porter (record producer)